Alberto Martín didn't try to defend his 2008 title.
Oleksandr Dolgopolov Jr. won the tournament, by defeating Lamine Ouahab 6–2, 6–2 in the final.

Seeds

Draw

Final four

Top half

Bottom half

References
 Main Draw
 Qualifying Draw

ATP Challenger Trophy - Singles
2009 Singles